Lukas Sinimbo Muha is a politician from Namibia who is serving as Chairperson of the National Council of Namibia from December 2020 and Joint Namibia Branch President of Commonwealth Parliamentary Association.

Personal life and career 
He was born in 2 September 1972. He also served as Member of parliament from Mankumpi Constituency from 2015 to 2020 and Member of Regional Council of Kavango West.

References 

1972 births
Chairpersons of the National Council (Namibia)
Living people